Agripina Zaituni Buyogera (born 16 August 1966) is a Tanzanian NCCR–Mageuzi politician and Member of Parliament for Kasulu Rural  constituency since 2010.

References

1966 births
Living people
NCCR–Mageuzi MPs
Tanzanian MPs 2010–2015